Zhenping may refer to the following places in China:

 Zhenping County, Henan
 Zhenping County, Shaanxi
 Zhenping Road station, of the Shanghai Metro
 Jiaoling County, formerly Zhenping County, Guangdong